John Matthew Murray (23 June 1873 – 31 May 1916) was a Scottish first-class cricketer and Royal Navy officer.

The son of James and Christina Murray, he was born at Aberdeen in June 1873. He was educated at both Aberdeen Grammar School and Galashiels Academy, before studying engineering at Heriot Watt Engineering School. He served in the Royal Navy, firstly as an assistant engineer, before being promoted to the rank of engineer in June 1902. He served as an engineering instructor at the Britannia Royal Naval College for over twenty years. A keen cricketer, Murray made a single first-class cricket appearance for the Royal Navy, making his debut against the British Army cricket team at Lord's in 1913. Batting twice in the match, he was dismissed without scoring in the Royal Navy's first-innings by Harold Fawcus, while in their second-innings he was dismissed for 29 runs by the same bowler. Murray served in the First World War, during which he was seconded to the battleship . He served aboard the ship at the Battle of Jutland on 31 May 1916, when he was killed after the ship exploded and sank.

References

External links

1873 births
1916 deaths
Cricketers from Aberdeen
People educated at Aberdeen Grammar School
People educated at Galashiels Academy
Alumni of Heriot-Watt University
Scottish military engineers
Scottish cricketers
Royal Navy cricketers
Royal Navy officers of World War I
British military personnel killed in World War I
Military personnel from Aberdeen